Da'shawn Thomas (August 31, 1987, in Newport, Arkansas) is a Canadian football running back from the U.S. who plays for the Western Ontario Mustangs. He was signed as a street free agent by the Georgia Generals in 2007.

Professional career

Toronto Argonauts
Thomas was signed as a free agent by the Toronto Argonauts of the Canadian Football League on February 29, 2008, and placed on the practice roster for the 2008 Toronto Argonauts season. He re-signed with the Argos on January 19, 2009, but was released at the end of training camp.

College career
In an unusual move, Thomas, who had never attended university and only a few days of a junior college in Kansas, registered with the University of Western Ontario and will play for the Western Ontario Mustangs in the 2009 CIS football season. The National Collegiate Athletic Association does not permit an athlete with any professional sports experience to play on a college team. However, since CIS football typically discounts one year for every year of professional experience, it is the only opportunity for Thomas to prepare for the 2010 NFL Draft. Former Mustang Vaughn Martin was drafted in the 2009 NFL Draft and former Mustangs receiver and current Argonaut Tyler Scott and former Argonauts coach Rich Stubler recommended Thomas to Mustangs coach Greg Marshall.

References

1987 births
Living people
Players of American football from Arkansas
American expatriate sportspeople in Canada
American players of Canadian football
Canadian football running backs
American football running backs
Western Mustangs football players
Toronto Argonauts players
People from Newport, Arkansas